Juan Carlos Díaz Quincoces (26 January 1933 – 28 November 2002), known as just Quincoces, was a Spanish footballer who played as a defender. He made eight appearances for the Spain national team from 1957 to 1959.

References

External links
 

1933 births
2002 deaths
People from Vitoria-Gasteiz
Spanish footballers
Association football defenders
Spain international footballers
La Liga players
Valencia CF players
Real Murcia players
Deportivo Alavés players